Albert Pompey Austin (1846?–1889), also known as Pompey Austin and Poorne Yarriworri, was an Australian footballer, cricketer and athlete. The first Indigenous person to play senior Australian Rules football in Victoria when he played for Geelong Football Club in 1872. He was a Djab Wurrung man.

Early life
Albert "Pompey" Austin was born in the mid-1840s near Camperdown in Victoria. A member of the Djargurd wurrung his name was Poorne Yarriworri. He lived at the Framlingham mission near Warrnambool.

Career 
Austin was well known for his athletic ability, winning the Geelong Friendly Societies’ Gift in 1872. Austin played for Geelong Football Club on 25 May 1872 against Carlton Football Club.

Austin worked in the Kimberley region of Western Australia with explorer William J. O'Donnell leading gold seekers from Wyndham to the emerging goldfields at Halls Creek.  Mary Durack records that gold seekers heading to Halls Creek told of O'Donnell, William Carr Boyd and "that flash ... Pompey" leading them through the rugged country from Wyndham for "a pound a head". A landmark near Halls Creek, a rocky outcrop known as Pompeys Pillar, is named after Austin.

Personal life
Austin married Rosanna Francis in 1867. Austin died in 1889.

References

1889 deaths
Geelong Football Club (VFA) players
Indigenous Australian players of Australian rules football
Year of birth uncertain